Urban local body elections to 12 municipal corporations and 75 municipal councils and nagar panchayats in the state of Andhra Pradesh were held on 10 March 2021.

Elections to the remaining Municipal Corporations, Municipal Councils and Nagar Panchayats are not held due to issues like court cases, delay in preparation of electoral rolls, problems in delimitation of wards and creation of new bodies.

Background 

The elections were previously scheduled on March 23 were post-poned due to COVID-19 pandemic in India. The election process will be continued from the previous nominations filed. The elections will be held in 12 municipal corporations and 75 municipalities and nagara panchaytis. Elections will not be conducted in Rajamahendravaram Municipal Corporation, Nellore Municipal Corporation, Srikakulam Municipal Corporation and 29 municipalities/nagara panchayatis.

Election schedule

Election results

Party wise Results

District wise Results

Srikakulam

Vizianagaram

Vishakapatnam

East Godavari

West Godavari

Krishna

Guntur

Prakasam

Nellore

Anantapuramu

Kurnool

Kadapa

Chittoor

Ward wise Results

Municipal corporations

Municipal Councils

Nagar Panchayats

See also 

 2021 Greater Visakhapatnam Municipal Corporation election
 2021 Vijayawada Municipal Corporation election
 2021 Guntur Municipal Corporation election
2021 Eluru Municipal Corporation election
2021 Ongole Municipal Corporation election
2021 Vizianagaram Municipal Corporation election

References

External links 

Urban Local Bodies election notification and schedule

Local elections in Andhra Pradesh

Local government in Andhra Pradesh
2020s in Andhra Pradesh
2021 elections in India